Peaked Hill may refer to:

 Peaked Hill (Massachusetts)
 Peaked Hill (Hong Kong)
 Peaked Hill Bars, off the Atlantic Coast of Provincetown, Massachusetts

See also
 Peaked Mountain (disambiguation)